Valentyn Grigoryevich Mankin (19 August 1938 – 1 June 2014) was a Soviet/Ukrainian sailor from Kyiv, three times Olympic champion for the USSR team.

Life
Mankin was Jewish.  
He trained at VSS Vodnik and scored his first Olympic triumph at the 1968 Summer Olympics in Mexico City, when he dominated his 35 opponents in the Finn class, finishing first or second in five of the seven races to win the gold medal.

At the 1972 Summer Olympics in Munich, Mankin switched classes and teamed with Vitaly Dyrdyra to win the Tempest class. At the 1976 Summer Olympics in Montreal he added a silver with a new partner, Vladyslav Akimenko. At the 1980 Summer Olympics in Moscow at the age of 41 years with Aleksandr Muzychenko, he raced in the Star class. The contest went down to the final race, but Mankin pulled off the victory and won the Gold Medal.

At the end of the eighties he moved to Livorno, Italy, as technical director and coach of the Italian Sailing Federation, where he trained a top generation of sailors. In Livorno, he also founded the Olympic Training Centre, dedicated to Beppe Croce (Olympic Sailor and President of Italian Sailing Federation).

, Valentin Mankin remains the only sailor in Olympic history to win gold medals in three different classes. (Finn, Tempest and Star).

He died on 1 June 2014 in Viareggio, Italy.

See also
List of select Jews in sailing

Bibliography

References

External links
 
 
 

1938 births
2014 deaths
Ukrainian male sailors (sport)
Soviet male sailors (sport)
Olympic sailors of the Soviet Union
Olympic gold medalists for the Soviet Union
Olympic silver medalists for the Soviet Union
Jewish sailors (sport)
Soviet Jews
Jewish Ukrainian sportspeople
Sportspeople from Kyiv
Olympic medalists in sailing
Sailors at the 1968 Summer Olympics – Finn
Sailors at the 1972 Summer Olympics – Tempest
Sailors at the 1976 Summer Olympics – Tempest
Sailors at the 1980 Summer Olympics – Star
Medalists at the 1968 Summer Olympics
Medalists at the 1972 Summer Olympics
Medalists at the 1976 Summer Olympics
Medalists at the 1980 Summer Olympics
Honoured Masters of Sport of the USSR
Recipients of the Order of Friendship of Peoples